A Tōshō-gū (東照宮) is any Shinto shrine in which Tokugawa Ieyasu is enshrined with the name Tōshō Daigongen (東照大権現). This list may never be complete given the widespread veneration of Tōshō Daigongen.
 Dewa Sanzan Tōshō-gū 出羽三山神社
 Hamamatsu Tōshō-gū 浜松東照宮
 Hanazono Shrine 花園神社
 Hida Tōshō-gū 飛騨東照宮
 Hirosaki Tōshō-gū 弘前東照宮
 Hiroshima Tōshō-gū 広島東照宮
 Hiyoshi Tōshō-gū 日吉東照宮
 Hokkaidō Tōshō-gū 北海道東照宮
 Hōraisan Tōshō-gū 鳳来山東照宮
 Iga Tōshō-gū 伊賀東照宮
 Kishū Tōshō-gū (also Wakayama Tōshō-gū)
 Kunōzan Tōshō-gū 久能山東照宮
 Matsudaira Tōshō-gū 松平東照宮
 Matsue Jinja 松江神社
 Mito Tōshō-gū 水戸東照宮
 Maebashi Tōshō-gū 前橋東照宮
 Nagoya Tōshō-gū 名古屋東照宮
 Nikkō Tōshō-gū 日光東照宮
 Ōchidani Jinja 樗谿神社
 Oshi Tōshō-gū 忍東照宮
 Reikyū Jinja 霊丘神社
 Sendai Tōshō-gū 仙台東照宮
 Serada Tōshō-gū 世良田東照宮
 Shiba Tōshō-gū 芝東照宮
 Tatsuo Jinja 龍尾神社
 Tokugawa Tōshō-gū 徳川東照宮
 Ueno Tōshō-gū 上野東照宮
 Yashima Jinja 屋島神社
 Yōkaichiba Tōshō-gū 八日市場東照宮

Three of the shrines are enumerated as the Three Great Tōshō-gū Shrines (日本三大東照宮):
Hōraisan Tōshō-gū 鳳来山東照宮
Senba Tōshō-gū 仙波東照宮
Takisan Tōshō-gū 滝山東照宮

See also 
List of Jingū

External links 
National Tōshō-gū association website
National Tōshō-gū association website (list of shrines)

 
Lists of religious buildings and structures in Japan
Lists of Shinto shrines